Hiriart is a surname. Notable people with the surname include:

Jhordy Hiriart, Mexican actor and singer
Joseph Hiriart (1888–1946), French architect
Lucía Hiriart (1923–2021), First Lady of Chile and widow of Augusto Pinochet